Alexandru Radu (born 9 May 1997) is a Romanian footballer who plays as a defender for Liga IV side Petrolistul Boldești. He was promoted to the first team of Petrolul Ploiești in May 2014.

References

1997 births
Living people
Sportspeople from Ploiești
Romanian footballers
FC Petrolul Ploiești players
CS Luceafărul Oradea players
Liga I players
Liga II players
Association football defenders